Strzyżowice may refer to the following places:
Strzyżowice, Lublin Voivodeship (east Poland)
Strzyżowice, Silesian Voivodeship (south Poland)
Strzyżowice, Świętokrzyskie Voivodeship (south-central Poland)